The Chinle Formation is an extensive geological unit in the southwestern United States, preserving a very diverse fauna of Late Triassic (primarily Norian-age) animals and plants. This is a list of fossilized organisms recovered from the formation.

Amniotes

Archosauromorphs

Crurotarsans

Other Archosauromorphs

Other amniotes

Amphibians

Cartilaginous fish

Lobe-finned fish

Coelacanths

Lungfish

Ray-finned fish

Plants
The Chinle Formation has a diverse flora of plant megafossils, though they are concentrated in only a few sites with suitable conditions. One of the most diverse floral communities is found near Fort Wingate, New Mexico. Paleobotanists have traditionally placed the Fort Wingate plant beds into the Monitor Butte Member, though more recently they are placed within the Bluewater Creek Formation, a subunit of the Chinle Formation first defined in 1989. Some Fort Wingate plant fossils belong to the "Lake Ciniza beds", a localized patch of grey mudstone corresponding to an ancient lake.

Another productive areas for plant fossils is Petrified Forest National Park in Arizona. Though petrified wood could be found through the entire stratigraphy of the park, most other plant fossils are exclusive to greenish mudstone layers adjacent to the Newspaper Rock sandstone bed in the Blue Mesa Member (formerly known as the "Lower Petrified Forest").

Conifers are the most common and diverse plants, including petrified wood and leafy branches from massive trees (Araucarioxylon, Pagiophyllum) as well as smaller shrubby forms (Pelourdea). Cycad and bennettitalean leaves and other remains make up a significant portion of the flora (Zamites, Nilssoniopteris, Williamsonia, etc.). Ferns (Cladophlebis, Phlebopteris, Clathropteris, Cynepteris, etc.) are abundant, with a range of growth habits including low shrubs, tree ferns, and palm-like fronds comparable to their modern relatives. Sphenophytes (horsetails: Neocalamites, Equistetites, Schizoneura, etc.) have low diversity but high abundance, and the largest Neocalamites fossils in the Chinle Formation could reach up to 6 meters (20 feet) in height. "Seed ferns" (Chilbinia, Marcouia?) ginkgophytes (Baiera), and small lycopods (Chinlea, Selaginella) were present but uncommon. The flora is rounded out by unusual low-growing gymnosperms such as Sanmiguelia (an angiosperm-like shrub), Dechellyia, and Dinophyton (possible relatives of Gnetales).

The floral composition of the Chinle Formation (and other parts of Late Triassic North America) seem to shift with changes in climate over time. The lowest parts of the Chinle, such as the Shinarump Conglomerate, are dominated by the bennettitalean Eoginkgoites alongside the first occurrence of other persistent plants such as Phlebopteris, Equisetites, and most common conifer species. Subsequent subunits (such as the Blue Mesa Member, Monitor Butte Member, and Bluewater Creek Formation) are much more diverse, with a wide array of humidity-adapted plants making up the typical Chinle flora. This second floral zone is characterized by Dinophyton, a common but enigmatic shrubby gymnosperm. Plant fossils are rare in the upper part of the Chinle Formation, which was presumably much drier than the lower part. In these later layers, by far the most common plant fossils belong to Sanmiguelia (an endemic of southwestern North America) alongside conifers and horsetails.

Gymnosperms

Ferns

Other plants

Arthropods

References

Bibliography
 Irmis, R. B. 2005. The vertebrate fauna of the Upper Triassic Chinle Formation in northern Arizona. p. 63-88. in S.J. Nesbitt, W.G. Parker, and R.B. Irmis (eds.) 2005. Guidebook to the Triassic formations of the Colorado Plateau in northern Arizona: Geology, Paleontology, and History. Mesa Southwest Museum Bulletin 9.
 Mueller, B. D. and Parker, W. G. 2006. A new species of Trilophosaurus (Diapsida: Archosauromorpha) from the Sonsela Member (Chinle Formation) of Petrified Forest National Park, Arizona. In W. G. Parker, S. R. Ash & R. B. Irmis (eds.), A Century of Research at Petrified Forest National Park, 1906-2006: Geology and Paleontology. Museum of Northern Arizona Bulletin 62:119-125
 
 Weishampel, David B.; Dodson, Peter; and Osmólska, Halszka (eds.): The Dinosauria, 2nd, Berkeley: University of California Press. 861 pp. .

Chinle Formation